Telia Norge AS, formerly NetCom AS, is a Norwegian mobile phone operator. Founded in 1993, it is the second largest mobile phone operator in Norway. The company has about 1.641  million subscribers (April 2013), and the company headquarters are located in Nydalen in Oslo. It is owned by the Swedish company Telia Company. 
The Telia office in Trondheim consists mainly of sales, customer service and technical departments. Telia was for a while the exclusive carrier for iPhone (iPhone 3G) in Norway, until Telenor signed an agreement with Apple Inc. to also distribute the device in Scandinavia.

Availability for tracking customers whereabouts
An article form Dagens Næringsliv on September 16, 2013, stated that a security weakness at Telia resulted in the availability of "—with simple resources, to track [the whereabouts of] members of parliament and other Telia customers abroad, when they were on a job [trip] or on a holiday"—until the weakness was rectified (tette hullet) on  September 12, 2013.

Name change to Telia
On 1 March 2016 NetCom changed its name to Telia, most likely to avoid confusing their customers as they have been sharing TeliaSonera's logo for multiple years prior to the name change. They launched their "ROAM LIKE HOME" offer right after, allowing customers to use their existing mobile subscriptions in all Nordic and Baltic countries (With the exception of Iceland, Greenland and the Faroe Islands). They were the first mobile operator in Norway to provide a service of this nature. Until now, competing mobile operators had simply been offering roaming packs of mobile data at slightly discounted rates.

References

External links

Mobile phone companies of Norway
Companies formerly listed on the Oslo Stock Exchange
1993 establishments in Norway